The Sydney Yugoslav General Trade and Tourist Agency bombing occurred in Haymarket, Sydney on 16 September 1972, injuring 16 people. The perpetrators of the attack were alleged to be Croatian separatists.

History
On 16 September 1972, two bombs were detonated at Yugoslav travel agencies located in inner Sydney. The first injured 16 people, two of them were critically injured; the second bomb injured none. The bombings were alleged to be connected to the executions of Croatians with Australian passports in Yugoslavia. The New South Wales Police later raided a number of Croatian homes in Sydney.

See also
Terrorism in Australia

References

Terrorist incidents in Australia
1972 crimes in Australia
Crime in Sydney
Terrorist incidents in Oceania in 1972
1970s in Sydney
Haymarket, New South Wales
Terrorist incidents in Australia in the 1970s
Croatian nationalist terrorism
September 1972 events in Australia
Australia–Yugoslavia relations